Sven Isak Danell (25 November 1903 - 18 January 1981) was a Swedish prelate who served as Bishop of Skara between 1955 and 1969.

Biography
Danell was born on 25 November 1903 in Uppsala, Sweden. His father, Hjalmar Danell, was Bishop of Skara between 1905 and 1935, while his uncle, Gideon Danell, was a notable Swedish teacher and linguist. Danell studied religion and linguistics at the universities of Gothenburg, Uppsala and Lund. He was ordained priest on 10 June 1928. He was appointed to a congregation in Skara while in 1933 he became vicar of St Catherine's Church in Noarootsi in present-day Estonia. In 1937 he returned to Sweden and became vicar of Källby Church. Between 1941 and 1949 he served as vicar of Västra Tunhems Church.

On 27 July 1955 Danell was appointed Bishop of Skara and was consecrated on 18 March 1956 by Archbishop Yngve Brilioth. He retained the post till 1969. He was married to Miriam Helén and had six children.

References

Bishops of Skara
Swedish Lutheran bishops
People from Uppsala
1903 births
1981 deaths